Sandholme railway station was a station on the Hull and Barnsley Railway, and served the hamlet of Sandholme in the East Riding of Yorkshire, England.

The station opened on 27 July 1885, it was closed to passengers on 1 August 1955 and closed completely on 6 April 1959.

References

External links
 Sandholme station on navigable 1947 O. S. map

Disused railway stations in the East Riding of Yorkshire
Railway stations in Great Britain opened in 1885
Railway stations in Great Britain closed in 1955
Former Hull and Barnsley Railway stations